The Face on the Barroom Floor is a 1932 pre-Code American crime film directed by Bertram Bracken and starring Dulcie Cooper, Bramwell Fletcher and Alice Ward.

Cast
 Dulcie Cooper as Mary Grove Bronson  
 Bramwell Fletcher as Bill Bronson  
 Alice Ward as Mrs. Grove  
 Phillips Smalley as C.E. Grove  
 Walter Miller as Sam Turner  
 Maurice Black as Cesar Vanzetti  
 Eddie Fetherston as 'Dr. Slick' Waters  
 Pat Wing as Miss Lee, Turner's secretary

References

Bibliography
 Pitts, Michael R. Poverty Row Studios, 1929-1940. McFarland & Company, 2005.

External links
 

1932 films
1932 crime films
American crime films
American black-and-white films
Chesterfield Pictures films
Films directed by Bertram Bracken
1930s English-language films
1930s American films
English-language crime films